Triphenylphosphine sulfide (IUPAC name: triphenyl-λ5-phosphanethione) is the organophosphorus compound with the formula , usually written  (where Ph = phenyl). It is a colourless solid, which is soluble in a variety of organic solvents.

Structurally, the molecule resembles the corresponding oxide, with idealized C3 point group symmetry. It is weakly nucleophilic at the sulfur atom.

Applications

Organic synthesis
Triphenylphosphine sulfide is useful for the conversion of epoxides to the corresponding episulfides:

Analytical chemistry
In analytical chemistry, triphenylphosphine is used for the analysis of certain kinds of sulfur compounds. Elemental sulfur, as occurs in some oils, and labile organosulfur compounds, such as organic trisulfides, react with triphenylphosphine to give , which can be detected by gas chromatography.

References

Organophosphine sulfides
Phenyl compounds